Jørgen Hansen Burchart (born c. 1630) was a Danish-Norwegian government official.  He served as the County Governor of Nyborg og Tranekjaer county in Denmark during 1692 and then of Lister og Mandal county from 1692 to 1699.

Burchart was the son of the Bishop of the Diocese of Ribe, Hans Borchardsen and his wife Karen Jørgensdatter Brod. He attended the University of Copenhagen from 1651 to 1654.

References

County governors of Norway